With Love is Bobby Vinton's twenty-fourth and final studio album for Epic Records and his twenty-fifth album overall. It was released in 1974, two years after Epic released Vinton from his contract with them and immediately after the release of Melodies of Love (Vinton's first album for ABC Records). The purpose of this release was to take advantage of the success of the aforementioned Melodies of Love and his biggest hit at the time "My Melody of Love". Two of the ten songs had previously been released on other albums, including "And I Love You So", a new version of the song originally recorded for Ev'ry Day of Life, this time produced by Billy Sherrill and arranged by Cam Mullins.

Track listing

Side 1
 "Seasons in the Sun" - (Rod McKuen, Jacques Brel) - 3:24
 "And I Love You So" - (Don McLean) - 2:55 
 "When You Love" - (Bobby Vinton) - 2:40
 "Moody" - (Ekundayo Paris, Anna Mitchell) - 2:43
 "She's Gotta Be a Saint" - (J. Paulini, Michael Di Napoli) - 2:30

Side 2
 "Sealed With a Kiss" - (Peter Udell, Gary Geld) - 2:52 (previously on Sealed With a Kiss)
 "Hurt" - (Jimmie Crane, Al Jacobs) - 2:57
 "I Love You the Way You Are" - (Bobby Vinton) - 2:46 (previously on Bobby Vinton Sings The Big Ones)
 "Clinging Vine" - (Earl Shuman, Leon Carr, Gary Lane) - 2:27 (previously on More of Bobby's Greatest Hits)
 "I Can't Believe That It's All Over" - (Ben Peters) - 2:24

Personnel
Bobby Vinton - producer
Billy Sherrill - producer ("And I Love You So" and "I Can't Believe That It's All Over")
Jimmy Wisner - producer ("Seasons in the Sun")
Bob Morgan - producer ("Clinging Vine")
Dick Glasser - producer ("Moody")
Al Capps - arranger ("Sealed With a Kiss", "Hurt" and "I Love You the Way You Are")
Bill Pursell - string arrangements ("I Can't Believe That It's All Over")
Cam Mullins - arranger ("And I Love You So")

Charts

Singles

1974 albums
Bobby Vinton albums
Albums produced by Billy Sherrill
Albums produced by Dick Glasser
Epic Records albums